The 2014 British Academy Scotland New Talent Awards were held on 25 March 2014 at The Arches (Glasgow).  Presented by BAFTA Scotland, the accolades honour the best upcoming talent in the field of film and television in Scotland. The Nominees were announced on 7 March 2014. The ceremony was hosted by Muriel Gray.

Winners and nominees

Winners are listed first and highlighted in boldface.
{| class=wikitable
|-
! style="background:#EEDD82; width:50%" | Best Fiction Film
! style="background:#EEDD82; width:50%" | Best Acting Performance
|-
| valign="top" |
The Groundsman
 Joyride
 A Practical Guide To A Spectacular Suicide
| valign="top" |
Julie Speers – Wyld as Julie
 Jasmine Main – Bear With Me as Angel
 Graeme McGeagh – A Practical Guide to a Spectacular Suicide
|-
! style="background:#EEDD82; width:50%" | Best Writer
! style="background:#EEDD82; width:50%" | Best Comedy/Entertainment Programme
|-
| valign="top" |
Michael Crumley – Hannah
 Jonny Blair – The Groundsman
 Gabriel Robertson – Bucket
| valign="top" |
Fistpunch – Ruth Gallacher, Ally Lockhart The Arsehole Gene – Eric Romero
 Dolly's House – Marie-Cecile Murphy, Christopher Sneddon
|-
! style="background:#EEDD82; width:50%" | Best Director of Photography
! style="background:#EEDD82; width:50%" | Best Editor
|-
| valign="top" |Ansgar Hoeckh – Judas Goat
 Laura Wadha - Hester
| valign="top" |
Conor Meechan – The Groundsman 
 Sanja Marjanovic – BFF
 Jenny Crook – Situation Normal All Fucked Up
|-
! style="background:#EEDD82; width:50%" | Best Factual
! style="background:#EEDD82; width:50%" | Best Original Music
|-
| valign="top" |
Finding Family – Carol Cooke, Chris Leslie, Garret Tankosic Kelly, Oggi Tomic Radio Silence – Duncan Cowles, Scott Willis
 Red Dust – Ilona Kacieja
| valign="top" |Jessica Jones – Hannah
 Alec Cheer, Drew Wright – Sarah's Room
 Tim Courtney – Sunsets & Silhouettes
|-
! style="background:#EEDD82; width:50%" | Best Sound Design
! style="background:#EEDD82; width:50%" | Best Production Design
|-
| valign="top" |
Paul Kowalik – Out Of The Ash
 Cliff Rossiter – Loyal
 Will Cory – Sarah's Room
| valign="top" |
'Ailsa Williams – Hello From Earth Sharon Kaye – Loyal
 'Eve Murray – Black Night Broken, White Morning Woken
|-
! style="background:#EEDD82; width:50%" | Best Game
! style="background:#EEDD82; width:50%" | Best Animation
|-
| valign="top" |Lub Vs Dub – Futuro Attack of the Ghastly Grey Matter – Milksteak and the Jellybeans
 9.03M – Space Budgie
| valign="top" |Spectators – Ross Hogg' In Sight – Alexandru Nechifor
 The House With No Doors – Oana Nechifor
|-
|}

Special Award for New WorkFinding Family''

See also
2014 British Academy Scotland Awards

References

External links
BAFTA Scotland Home page

New Talent
British Academy Scotland
British Academy Scotland New Talent Awards
2014 in British cinema
British Academy Scotland New Talent Awards, 2014
British Academy Scotland New Talent Awards
British Academy Scotland New Talent Awards
BAFTA
British Academy Scotland New Talent Awards